Narraport is a town in the Mallee and Mount Jeffcot wards of the local government area of the Shire of Buloke, Victoria, Australia. There is a rural CFA station in Narraport. The post office there opened on 1 February 1879 and was closed on 29 February 1968.

References